Kakpagyili is a suburb of the Tamale Metropolis  in the Northern Region of Ghana. Kakpagyili is a community in the Tamale Metropolitan Assembly (TMA) and part of the Tamale South Constituency with Hon. Haruna Iddrisu as the Member of Parliament (MP). The Local Chief of Kakpagyili Community is called Gumanaa. It shares boundaries with Bamvum, Bilpeila, Zujuŋ and Tuutiŋli.

Economic activities 
 Trading
 Farming

List of Kakpagyili Chiefs 

 Gumanaa Fusheni (current Chief)
 Gumanaa Aliru
 Gumanaa Amaru
Gumanaa Lansa

Sub-Communities in Kakpagyili 

 Kukpegu
 Zohi Fong
 Loloto Fong
 Gunzugu
 Niima Fong

List of Senior High Schools

 Presbyterian Senior High School (PRESEC ), Bamvum campus
Timtooni Senior High School
 Ghana Libya Senior High School
Majidiya Islamic Senior High School

key Landmarks 

 Kakpagyili Chief's Palace
 Kakpagyili CHPS Compound
 SIC Quarters
 I no go sale building materials
 ZEN Filling Station
 Kakpayili Market
 Celsbridge Enterprise Company Limited

See also
Suburbs of Tamale (Ghana) metropolis

References 

Communities in Ghana
Suburbs of Tamale, Ghana